Hermann Mayr (born 15 May 1929) was an Austrian cross-country skier. He competed at the 1956 Winter Olympics and the 1964 Winter Olympics.

References

External links
  

1929 births
Possibly living people
Austrian male cross-country skiers
Olympic cross-country skiers of Austria
Cross-country skiers at the 1956 Winter Olympics
Cross-country skiers at the 1964 Winter Olympics
Sportspeople from Tyrol (state)
20th-century Austrian people